Kamikaze is a 1986 French science fiction film directed by Didier Grousset.

Plot
A brilliant scientist goes insane and develops a technology that enables him to kill people by sending death rays through television cameras. He kills TV announcers and is soon hunted by police.

Cast
 Richard Bohringer as Romain Pascot
 Michel Galabru as Albert 
 Dominique Lavanant as Laure Frontenac
 Romane Bohringer as Julie 
 Étienne Chicot as Samrat
 Riton Liebman as Olive

Reception
The storyline has been characterised as "short and strange". The film received mixed reviews, with one reviewer writing that Kamikaze had a "cool vibe". A reviewer for trashcity.org called the film "impressive". A reviewer for cinefileonline.co.il wrote that Kamikaze delivered "evidence of style and flair" and was "stylish fun".

Production
Luc Besson co-wrote and produced Kamikaze right after Subway.

Soundtrack
Two pieces have been published on a single in 1986.

DVD release
Kamikaze was originally released on VHS. In 2013 a digitally re-mastered HD French-language version with Japanese subtitles (NTSC, region 2) was issued.

References

External links

1986 films
French science fiction films
1980s French-language films
1980s science fiction films
Films produced by Luc Besson
Films scored by Éric Serra
Films with screenplays by Luc Besson
1980s French films